Miguel Escobar (born 18 April 1945) is a Colombian former footballer. He played in 15 matches for the Colombia national football team from 1975 to 1979. He was also part of Colombia's squad for the 1975 Copa América tournament.

References

External links
 

1945 births
Living people
Colombian footballers
Colombia international footballers
Place of birth missing (living people)
Association football defenders
Deportivo Cali footballers